Christopher Paul Beardshaw (born 11 January 1969) is a British garden designer, plantsman, author, speaker, and broadcaster.

Background
Beardshaw was formally trained in Horticulture at Pershore College, and holds a BA Hons and PGDip in Landscape Architecture from the University of Gloucestershire. He has won 35 prestigious design awards, including 12 RHS Gold Medals; the latest was for his Morgan Stanley Garden for the NSPCC at RHS Chelsea Flower Show in 2018, which also was awarded the coveted Best Show Garden Award. He has also been voted for the People's Choice Award 5 times.

His first TV appearance was in 1999 as the expert on Surprise Gardeners for Carlton TV. After this, he moved to the BBC TV and Real Rakeovers as the expert contributor. His first show as solo presenter was Weekend Gardener for UKTV Style in 2000. Also in 2000, he co-presented Gardening Neighbours for BBC 2. This was followed by three series of Housecall. After this, he joined Gardeners' World Live as a specialist presenter, and then soon moved on to become a presenter on Gardeners' World, alongside Monty Don and Rachel De Thame. Beardshaw was perhaps best known for his The Flying Gardener series for BBC2, which ran for four series. He currently presents Beechgrove and is a regular panel member on BBC Radio 4's Gardeners' Question Time.

The Chris Beardshaw Rose was launched at the Hampton Court Flower Show in July 2007.  Beautifully scented with soft pink blooms, the new rose was produced by international rose specialist C&K Jones. Chris Beardshaw specifically asked for a donation (£2.50) to be made to the Royal Lifeboat Institution (RNLI) for every rose sold.

He holds an Honorary Degree from Liverpool University and is an Honorary Fellow of Gloucestershire University, and in 2017 was awarded the Kew Guild Gold Award.

References

External links
 Official website
 Gardener's Question Time on Radio 4

English gardeners
English television presenters
English garden writers
Living people
Alumni of Pershore College of Horticulture
1969 births